The Indianapolis 8 Hour is an endurance sports car race contested at Indianapolis Motor Speedway using the infield road course, first held in 2020, making it the first ever endurance sports car race at this venue. The event is the US leg of the Intercontinental GT Challenge (IGTC) and the finale of the GT World Challenge America series.

In 2022 the race ran into the twilight for the first time; the rules changed to GT3 only, dropping GT4; and the GT World Challenge America entrants were awarded points at the full 8 hours rather than at the three-hour mark in previous years.

For the GT World Challenge America drivers, this event is the longest of the races and the only event to include three drivers.

For the cars additionally competing in IGTC, this event differs from the remainder of IGTC, with the maximum number of Gold or Platinum drivers reduced to two.

In 2022 14 cars took part in the IGTC within the total grid of 25 entries running GT World Challenge America.

History 
The US leg of the SRO's IGTC - the California 8 Hours - was held at Laguna Seca circuit from 2016 to 2019. The event was moved to Indianapolis in 2020. 

For 2022 the GT World Challenge America element of the event was extended such that the entire 8 hour duration scored points for the GTWC America entrants; in previous years those entrants scored points for the first three hours only.

Additionally for 2022 GT4 classes were dropped from the race making it GT3 only.

Winners

See also
 Intercontinental GT Challenge

Notes

References

External links 
 Official page - Intercontinental GT Challenge
 Official page - venue

Sports car races
Endurance motor racing
Annual sporting events in the United States
Auto races in the United States
Motorsport in Indianapolis